Mihailo Ristić may refer to:

 Mihailo Ristić-Džervinac (1854-1916), Serbian officer and conspirator of the May Coup
 Mihailo Ristić (diplomat) (1864-1925), Serbian diplomat and counsel
 Mihailo Ristić (footballer) (born 1995), Serbian footballer